Hassan Taftian (born 4 May 1993 in Torbat-e Heydarieh) is an Iranian sprinter. He represented his country at two outdoor and one indoor World Championships.

Taftian won the gold medal in 100 metres at the 2012 Asian Junior Athletics Championships in Colombo, Sri Lanka. On 8 July 2017 Taftian became the first Iranian to ever win the gold medal in 100 metres in an Asian Athletics Championships after finishing with a time of 10.25 seconds at the 2017 Asian Athletics Championships in Bhubaneswar, India.

International competitions

1Did not start in the final

Personal bests
Outdoor
100 metres – 10.029 (+1.2 m/s, Paris 2018)
200 metres – 20.71 (Tehran 2017)
Indoor
60 metres – 6.51A (Tehran 2018)

See also
 List of Iranian records in athletics

References

External links

1993 births
Living people
Iranian male sprinters
Olympic male sprinters
Olympic athletes of Iran
Athletes (track and field) at the 2016 Summer Olympics
Athletes (track and field) at the 2020 Summer Olympics
Asian Games competitors for Iran
Athletes (track and field) at the 2014 Asian Games
Athletes (track and field) at the 2018 Asian Games
World Athletics Championships athletes for Iran
Asian Indoor Athletics Championships winners
21st-century Iranian people
Islamic Solidarity Games competitors for Iran